Zbytiny is a municipality and village in Prachatice District in the South Bohemian Region of the Czech Republic. It has about 400 inhabitants.

Administrative parts
Villages and hamlets of Blažejovice, Koryto, Skříněřov, Spálenec and Sviňovice are administrative parts of Zbytiny.

References

Villages in Prachatice District
Bohemian Forest